Hasina Banu Shirin (27 November 1959 – 24 May 2011) is a Jatiya Party (Ershad) politician and the former Member of Parliament of Khulna-3.

Career
Shirin was elected to parliament from Khulna-3 as a Jatiya Party candidate in 1986. She served as the whip of the parliament.

References

1959 births
2011 deaths
People from Khulna District
Jatiya Party politicians
3rd Jatiya Sangsad members